Project Runway New Zealand is a New Zealand-based reality competition show, and an adaptation of the international Project Runway franchise. The show aired for one season, from 1 October to 12 November 2018, on TVNZ 2. It was hosted by Georgia Fowler, and featured 14 contestants from the country, competing to win a Holden Astra car, a cash prize of $50,000 NZD, and a six-page cover spread in Fashion Quarterly magazine. The winner of the season was Benjamin Alexander, who resides in Auckland, New Zealand, whilst the runner-up of the competition was Jess Hunter.

Overview

Contestants
(Ages and names stated are at time of contest)

Contestant progress

 The designer won the challenge.
 The designer was part of the winning team, but did not win the main challenge.
 The designer received positive critiques but ultimately moved to the next challenge.
 The designer received judges critiques but ultimately moved to the next challenge.
 The designer received negative critiques but ultimately moved to the next challenge.
 The designer was in the bottom two.
 The designer was eliminated.

Episodes

Models

All of the models on the Project Runway New Zealand are represented by an elite modelling agency Red11 Model Management| based in Auckland.

References

External links
Project Runway New Zealand website powered by TVNZ 2.

New Zealand reality television series
2018 in New Zealand television
2018 in fashion
2018 New Zealand television series debuts